April Brooks may refer to:

 April Brooks (born 1987), real name of American professional wrestler AJ Lee
 April Brooks, fictional character in the British television series Emmerdale